"Beautiful England" was the title of a series of short, illustrated travel/guide books first published in Britain by Blackie & Son around 1910 and continuing in print until the 1950s. Each title featured a particular region, town or city in England and was illustrated by watercolour landscape painter, E. W. Haslehust.

Blackie & Son also published other related series: "Beautiful Scotland" (4 vols. or 4 pts. in 1 vol.), "Beautiful Ireland" (Leinster, Ulster, Munster, Connaught; painted by Alex. Williams; described by Stephen Gwynn; 4 vols. or 4 pts. in 1) and "Beautiful Switzerland" (Chamonix; Lausanne and its Environs; Lucerne; Villars and its Environs: all pictured and described by George Flemwell).

Book titles

"Beautiful England" series

Bradley, A. G. The English Lakes (1910).
Heath, Sidney. Winchester (1911).
Danks, William. Canterbury (1910).
Thomas, Edward. Windsor Castle (1910).
Heath, Sidney. The Heart of Wessex (1910).
How, Frederick Douglas. Oxford (1910).
Jerrold, Walter. Norwich and the Broads (1910).
Mitton, G. E. The Thames (1910).
Jerrold, Walter. Shakespeare-Land (1910).
Barwell, Noel. Cambridge (1911).
Benson, George. York (1911).
Thomas, Edward. The Isle of Wight (1911).
Edwards, Charles & Bennett, J. H. E. Chester (1911).
Gilchrist, R. Murray. The Peak District (1911).
Heath, Sidney. The Cornish Riviera (1911).
Nicklin, J. A. Dickens Land (1911).
Godfrey, Elizabeth. The New Forest (1912).
Heath, Sidney. Exeter (1912).
Jerrold, Walter. Hampton Court (1912).  
Gilchrist, R. Murray. The Dukeries (1913).
Edwardes, Charles. Hereford (1913).
Morley, George. Warwick and Leamington (1913).
Salmon, Arthur Leslie. Dartmoor (1913).
Salmon, Arthur Leslie. Bath and Wells (1914).
Gilchrist, R. Murray. Scarborough And Neighbourhood (1914).
Gilchrist, R. Murray. Ripon and Harrogate (1914).
Heath, Sidney. Bournemouth, Poole and Christchurch (1915).
Heath, Sidney. Swanage and District (1915).
Higgins, Walter. Hastings and Neighbourhood (1920).
Jerrold, Walter. Folkestone and Dover (1920).
Jerrold, Walter. The Heart of London (1924).
Jerrold, Walter. Through London's Highways (1924).
Jerrold, Walter. In London's By-Ways (1925).
Jerrold, Walter. Rambles in Greater London (1925).

"Beautiful Scotland" series

Eyre-Todd, George. Loch Lomond, Loch Katrine, and the Trossachs (1922).
Geddie, John. Edinburgh (1936).
Geddie, John. The Scott Country (1938).
Geddie, John. The Shores of Fife (1922).
 
"Beautiful Ireland" series

Gwynn, S. L. Ulster (1911).
Gwynn, S. L. Leinster (1911).
Gwynn, S. L. Munster (1912).
Gwynn, S. L. Connaught (1912)
Gorges, Mary. Killarney (1912).

External links
Beautiful England - background notes on the series and full text and images from selected titles.
Beautiful England (Blackie and Son Limited) - Book Series List - articles, book notices and advertisements on the four series.

Travel guide books
Geography of England
Books about England